Lure of the Gold is a 1922 American silent Western film directed by and starring Neal Hart.

Cast
 Neal Hart as Jack Austin
 Hazel Deane as The Singer
 William Quinn as Chuck Wallace
 Ben Corbett as Latigo Bob

Preservation
The Lure of the Gold survives in the Library of Congress.

References

External links

 
 

1922 films
American black-and-white films
1922 Western (genre) films
Silent American Western (genre) films
1920s American films